Garuk-e Pain (also Romanized as Garūk-e Pā’īn; also known as Garak-e Pā’īn and Garūk-e Soflá) is a village in Kangan Rural District, in the Central District of Jask County, Hormozgan Province, Iran. At the 2006 census, its population was 167, in 31 families.

References 

Populated places in Jask County